Guna Zariņa (born 1 October 1972) is a Latvian actress. In the theater, she has appeared in several plays of Alvis Hermanis and Māra Ķimele. She has also appeared in several films.

In 2007 she received the Union of Latvian Theatre Workers Best Actress award, in 2015 she was awarded the Lielais Kristaps and in 2017 she was awarded the Order of Three Stars.

Filmography

References

External links

Guna Zariņa at the New Riga Theater homepage

1972 births
Living people
Latvian stage actresses
Latvian film actresses
21st-century Latvian actresses
Actors from Riga
Lielais Kristaps Award winners